Madhuri Misal is a leader of Bharatiya Janata Party and a member of the Maharashtra Legislative Assembly elected from Parvati (Vidhan Sabha constituency) in Pune city.

Positions held
 2009: Elected to Maharashtra Legislative Assembly.
 2014: Re-elected to Maharashtra Legislative Assembly. 
 2019: Re-elected to Maharashtra Legislative Assembly.

References

Politicians from Pune
Living people
Maharashtra MLAs 2014–2019
Marathi politicians
21st-century Indian women politicians
21st-century Indian politicians
Bharatiya Janata Party politicians from Maharashtra
1964 births
Women members of the Maharashtra Legislative Assembly